Philippe-Jacques van Bree, was a Belgian painter and scholar of his brother Mattheus, was born at Antwerp in 1786. He studied at Antwerp, in Paris (where he became a scholar of Anne-Louis Girodet-Trioson), and at Rome; and also visited Germany and England.

He employed himself on historical, fancy, and architectural subjects. Of the last, the Belgian Government purchased his View of the Interior of the Church of St. Peter at Rome, and presented him with a gold medal in addition to the price.

He was made conservator of the Museum at Brussels. He died in Saint-Josse-ten-Noode in 1871.

References
 

1786 births
1871 deaths
Artists from Antwerp
19th-century Flemish painters